John Mole (25 April 1949 – 1 August 2006) was an English bass guitar player.

Mole was born in Stratford, London. A member of Jon Hiseman's Colosseum II, he went on to work with fellow band members Gary Moore and Don Airey. He also played with the UK jazz-funk band Morrissey–Mullen during the late 1970s, and as a session musician, with artists such as Barbra Streisand and John Dankworth.

He was the first-call bassist for Andrew Lloyd Webber, appearing on the latter's Variations album as well as the successful Cats and Starlight Express musicals during the 1980s and 1990s.

References
Obituary in The Bass Player Magazine 2006

1949 births
2006 deaths
English male guitarists
Male bass guitarists
People from Stratford, London
Colosseum (band) members
20th-century English bass guitarists
20th-century British male musicians
Morrissey–Mullen members